Marijan Žužej (8 February 1934 – 18 December 2011) was a Croatian water polo player of Slovenian origin. He was part of the Yugoslavia teams that won a silver medal at the 1956 Olympics and placed fourth in 1960.

Žužej was born in Maribor to Slovenian parents and lost his father at early age. His mother and stepfather were doctors and fought with Yugoslav partisans during World War II. Žužej took up swimming and water polo in 1946, and in 1954 was included to the Yugoslav national team that won a bronze medal at European championships. In late 1957 he had a serious car accident. He recovered by the 1960 Olympics, but retired from competitions after that to become a water polo coach and administrator at his club HAVK Mladost. Besides water polo he worked as an architect in Slovenia and Austria.

See also
 List of Olympic medalists in water polo (men)

References

External links

 

1934 births
2011 deaths
Croatian male water polo players
Yugoslav male water polo players
Olympic water polo players of Yugoslavia
Water polo players at the 1956 Summer Olympics
Water polo players at the 1960 Summer Olympics
Olympic silver medalists for Yugoslavia
Olympic medalists in water polo
Sportspeople from Maribor
Croatian people of Slovenian descent
Medalists at the 1956 Summer Olympics
20th-century Croatian architects